Uson, officially the Municipality of Uson,  is a 3rd class municipality in the province of Masbate, Philippines. According to the 2020 census, it has a population of 57,166 people.

History
Uson was created as a municipality through Executive Order No. 244 signed by President Elpidio Quirino on July 18, 1949.

Geography
The municipality is bounded by the municipality of Mobo on the north with the Balatucan river; on the east Uson is bounded by the Barangay Balocawe of the municipality of Dimasalang; on the south it is bounded by the Baldosa river and Palo Bandera of Cawayan; on the west the municipality is bounded by Milagros.

The mountain borders the three municipalities of Uson, Mobo and Milagros.

Uson has several rivers, including Balucaw River, Buenavista River, Buracan River, Calpi River, Dap-dap River, Mongahay River, Pinangapugan (Quezon) River, and the Sawang River which all flow into Uson Bay. East of the poblacion a lake can be found, Lake Calero.

Seismic activity

The Philippine Fault System from which almost all of the recorded strong earthquakes in the Philippines emanated, traverses eastern Uson. As a result, strong seismic activity in the form of frequent earthquakes can be experienced. Link to PHIVOLCS website

Climate

Barangays

Uson is politically subdivided into 35 barangays

Demographics

Economy

References

External links

 [ Philippine Standard Geographic Code]
Philippine Census Information
Local Governance Performance Management System

Municipalities of Masbate
Establishments by Philippine executive order